INPS may refer to:

 Istituto nazionale della previdenza sociale of Italy
 In Practice Systems Limited, British health informatics company
 Integrated Nepal Power System, a component of the Nepal Electricity Authority
 Indonesian National Press and Publicity Service (INPS), a component of Antara (news agency)
National Polytechnic Institutes (France) (INPs)

See also

 
 
 INP (disambiguation)